Intermediate bulk containers (also known as IBC tank, IBC tote, IBC, or pallet tank) are industrial-grade containers engineered for the mass handling, transport, and storage of liquids, semi-solids, pastes, or solids. The two main categories of IBC tanks are flexible IBCs and rigid IBCs. Many IBCs are reused or repurposed.

Description

Rigid IBC tanks 

Rigid intermediate bulk containers are stackable, reusable, versatile containers with an integrated pallet base mount that provides forklift and/or pallet jack maneuverability. These containers can be made from metal, plastic, or a composite construction of the two materials. Rigid IBC design types are manufactured across a volume range that is in between that of standard shipping drums and intermodal tank containers, hence the title "intermediate“ bulk container. IBC totes are authorized per Title 49 CFR codes to be fabricated of a volume up to  while maintaining the "IBC" name and their federal shipping and handling permits.

IBC tank capacities generally used are often . Intermediate bulk containers are standardized shipping containers often UN/DOT certified for the transport handling of hazardous and non-hazardous, packing group II and packing group III commodities. Many IBC totes are manufactured according to federal and NSF/ANSI regulations and mandates, and are often IMDG approved as well for domestic and maritime transport. Metal alloy IBC tanks are also manufactured according to NFPA and UL142 certification standards for extensive storage of materials labeled as flammable and/or combustible.

Intermediate bulk containers can be manufactured from various materials based on the requirements of the application or service the IBC will be used for. Traditional materials include:

 Plastic (high-density polyethylene)
 Composite: galvanized steel and plastic
 Carbon steel
 Stainless steel (304 and 316/316L grades)

The most widely utilized and known IBC is the limited re-use, caged IBC tote container. Caged IBC totes are composite intermediate bulk containers — a white/translucent plastic container (typically high-density polyethylene) contained and protected by a tubular galvanized steel grid, common. Caged IBC totes are commonly used due to their low cost, wide compatibility, and versatility.

Flexible IBC tanks 

In addition to the above materials, flexible IBCs can also be made of fiberboard, wood, aluminum, and folding plastic. Folding IBCs are also made of heavy plastic. Their sides fold inward when the unit is empty allowing the IBC to collapse into a much smaller package for return shipment or storage. Flexible intermediate bulk containers, made of woven polyethylene or polypropylene bags, are designed for storing or transporting dry, flowable products, such as sand, fertilizer, and plastic granules.

Engineered design 
Most IBCs are cube-shaped and this cube-shaped engineering contributes to the packaging, stacking, storing, shipping, and overall space efficiency of intermediate bulk containers. IBC container’s pallet base is designed for universal maneuverability via forklift/pallet jack channels. Almost all rigid IBCs are designed so they can be stacked vertically one atop the other using a forklift. Most have a built-in tap (valve, spigot, or faucet) at the base of the container to which hoses can be attached, or through which the contents can be poured into smaller containers.

The most common IBC sizes of 275 and 330 US gallons fit on a single pallet of similar dimensions to pallets which hold 4 drums (220 US gallons), providing an extra 55-110 gallons of product in the IBC over drum storage, a 25%-50% increase for the same storage footprint. Additionally, IBCs can be manufactured to a customer's exact requirements in terms of capacity, dimensions, and material.

Advantages 
There are many advantages to the engineering and design of the IBC model:

 Being cubic in form, they can transport more material in the same footprint compared to cylindrical-shaped containers, and far more than might be shipped in the same space compared to packaging in consumer quantities.
 Composite IBCs rely on plastic liners that can be filled and discharged with a variety of systems.
 The manufacturer/processor of a product can bulk package a product in one country and ship to many other countries at a reasonably low cost where it is subsequently packaged in final consumer form in accordance with the regulations of that country and in a form and language suitable for that country.
High organization, mobility, integration capabilities.
Increase logistic and handling timelines, efficiencies, and capacity through single container filling, moving, loading, transit, and dispensing.
Potential long term assets given the durability of IBC construction materials.
Provides a reliable and consistent way to handle or store materials.

Uses 
IBCs are often used to ship, handle, and/or store:

Bulk chemicals including hazardous materials or dangerous goods
Commodities and raw materials used in industrial production
Liquid, granulated, and powdered food ingredients
Food syrups, such as corn syrup, maple syrup or molasses
Petrochemical products, such as oil, gas, solvents, detergents, or adhesives
Rainwater
Used IBCs are the basic building blocks for many home aquaponic systems
Paints and industrial coatings
Pharmaceutical compounds, ingredients, intermediates, batch products
Healthcare related items, solid commodities, bio-waste, waste materials
Vineyards, wine fermentation, spirits production
Agriculture, nursery, greenhouse uses and chemicals
Many water, waste water, process water applications across industry sectors
Used by land owners to support firefighting activities

Acquisition and disposal 

Intermediate bulk containers may be purchased or leased. Bar code and RFID tracking systems are available with associated software.

An IBC can be purchased as a new unit (bottle and cage), a rebottled unit (new bottle and washed cage) or a washed unit (both bottles and cages have been washed). A washed unit is typically less expensive, with the new unit being the most expensive, and the rebottled unit near the mid-point. In many cases, a customer may purchase a mix (“blend”) of these types of units under a single price, to simplify the accounting.

The customer's choice of unit primarily depends on either actual or perceived sensitivity of their product to contamination, and the overall ability to clean their specific product type from the bottle. Those with a lower contamination risk are prime candidates for the washed units. With the exception of products produced in "clean rooms" (GMP - good manufacturing practices), the decision of a washed over a new is usually a matter of availability or appearance.

An IBC can be leased in a closed-loop (using only the IBCs which were used by a given customer and washed or rebottled) or the most common open-loop system (where the origin of the rebottled or wash unit is flexible). For plastic composite units, the trip lease has largely been replaced by a blended purchase.
Single use flexible IBC's such as those used for aggregate transportation in the construction industry are a major source of plastic pollution. Most aggregate suppliers do not offer a scheme to refund a deposit upon return of empty IBC's & (in UK) they are frequently fly tipped & seen abandoned roadside.

Safety 

When exposed to fire as in a warehouse event, plastic IBCs containing combustible or flammable liquids can melt or burn fairly rapidly, releasing their entire contents and increasing the fire hazard by the sudden addition of combustible fuel. Rigid plastic (as high-density polyethylene) IBCs that transport and house flammable/combustibles are recommended to have clear labeling and stored within properly secured structures and according to federal regulations, such as NFPA and OSHA. Metal IBCs (as carbon steel and stainless steel) are often approved per UL 142 requirements for housing these materials long term. Accordingly, metal IBC tanks can be used for Class I materials, while rigid plastic IBCs can be used for Class II/III materials.

Concerning the mechanical stability and sloshing of intermediate bulk containers during transport, some research has been performed through the U.S. Department of Transportation which seems to indicate that IBC containers perform overall very well during transit in terms of sloshing and mechanical stability.

For metal IBCs, test reports by the German Bundesanstalt für Materialforschung und -prüfung (BAM) show that a metal IBC can withstand fire for at least 30 minutes, if it is equipped with a pressure venting device.

History 

The concept of the IBC was patented in 1992 by inventor Olivier J. L. D'Hollander working for Dow Corning S.A.
It was inspired by the patent of a "Fold up wire frame containing a plastic bottle", patented in 1990 by Dwight E. Nicols for Hoover Group, Inc.

See also

Barrel
Bulk box
CargoBeamer
Drum
 Drum pump
Dutch flower bucket
Flexible intermediate bulk container
Intermodal container
Liquid hydrogen tanktainer
Roller container
Spill pallet
Tank container
Wooden box

Further reading
 Yam, K. L., "Encyclopedia of Packaging Technology", John Wiley & Sons, 2009,

References

Containers
Packaging
Shipping containers